The 1991 Orange Bowl was the 57th edition of the college football bowl game, played at the Orange Bowl in Miami, Florida, on Tuesday, January 1. Part of the 1990–91 bowl game season, it matched the independent and fifth-ranked Notre Dame Fighting Irish and the #1 Colorado Buffaloes of the Big Eight Conference.

It was a rematch of the previous year, in which #4 Notre Dame defeated #1 Colorado, 21–6.  This time, Colorado won by a point, 10–9, and won a share of the national championship.

Teams

Notre Dame

The Fighting Irish were  both losses occurred when they were first in the polls, and at home. The first was a  loss to  Stanford on October 6. Sophomore quarterback Rick Mirer passed for 1,824 yards and eight touchdowns, while Raghib Ismail accounted for 1,726 all-purpose yards, putting him on the All-American team as a wide receiver.

Colorado

Colorado compiled a  record in the regular season. The winning touchdown was scored on that play, and it was allowed to stand. That game is often referred to as the "5th down game." One reason for the Buffaloes No. 1 ranking was that they had the toughest schedule of any team. Another was quarterback Darian Hagan and half back Eric Bieniemy, who finished third in the Heisman Trophy voting.

Game summary
After a scoreless first quarter, Colorado's Jim Harper kicked a 22-yard field goal for the game's first points. A few minutes later, on 2nd and goal, tailback Ricky Watters plunged in from two yards to give the Fighting Irish the lead. But when Ronnie Bradford blocked Craig Hentrich's PAT attempt, the score remained  This cost Hentrich his 73 straight successful PAT attempts, a school record. Things would turn sour for the Buffaloes, however, as Hagan ruptured his tendon in his left knee just before the half, where the score remained the same.

This bowl is also remembered for a controversial finish. Ismail returned a punt 92 yards for a likely game-winning touchdown with 43 seconds left. This could have sealed the victory for Notre Dame and cost Colorado a share of the national championship. However, the touchdown was called back on a clipping penalty, and Colorado held on for the

Scoring
First quarter
No scoring
Second quarter
Colorado – Jim Harper 22-yard field goal
Notre Dame – Ricky Watters 2-yard run (kick blocked)
Third quarter
Notre Dame – Craig Hentrich 24-yard field goal
Colorado – Eric Bieniemy 1-yard run (Harper kick)
Fourth quarter
No scoring

Statistics
{| class=wikitable style="text-align:center"
! Statistics !!Notre Dame !! Colorado
|-
|align=left|First Downs || 18 || 19
|-
|align=left|Rushes–yards|| 36–123|| 54–186
|-
|align=left|Passing yards || 141 || 109
|-
|align=left|Passes (C–A–I)|| 13–31–3 || 9–19–0
|-
|align=left|Total Offense || 67–265 || 73–295
|-
|align=left|Return yards || 68 || 50
|-
|align=left|Punts–average ||3–51|| 7–40
|-
|align=left|Fumbles–lost ||2–2|| 2–1
|-
|align=left|Turnovers||5||1
|-
|align=left|Penalties–yards ||3–45|| 6–50
|-
|align=left|Time of possession ||24:24||35:36
|}

Aftermath
The win gave the Buffaloes their first and (to date) only national championship, shared with  Notre Dame fell one spot to sixth in the final AP poll.

Notes

References

Orange Bowl
Orange Bowl
Colorado Buffaloes football bowl games
Notre Dame Fighting Irish football bowl games
College football controversies
Orange Bowl
January 1991 sports events in the United States